Hyposmocoma is a genus of moths with more 350 species endemic to the Hawaiian Islands. The genus was first described by Arthur Gardiner Butler in 1881. Most species of Hyposmocoma have plant-based diets, but four species, such as Hyposmocoma molluscivora, eat snails. The caterpillars spin silk, which they then use to capture and eat snails. These are the first caterpillars known to eat snails (or mollusks of any kind).

Some species are amphibious. This trait has evolved at least three times within this genus.

Species

Subgenus Euperissus Butler, 1881
Hyposmocoma adelphella Walsingham, 1907
Hyposmocoma adolescens Walsingham, 1907
Hyposmocoma agnetella (Walsingham, 1907)
Hyposmocoma albocinerea (Walsingham, 1907)
Hyposmocoma alticola Meyrick, 1915
Hyposmocoma anthinella (Walsingham, 1907)
Hyposmocoma argentea Walsingham, 1907
Hyposmocoma argomacha Meyrick, 1935
Hyposmocoma argyresthiella (Walsingham, 1907)
Hyposmocoma arundinicolor (Walsingham, 1907)
Hyposmocoma aspersa (Butler, 1882)
Hyposmocoma auroargentea Walsingham, 1907
Hyposmocoma barbata Walsingham, 1907
Hyposmocoma basivittata (Walsingham, 1907)
Hyposmocoma bitincta (Walsingham, 1907)
Hyposmocoma brevistrigata Walsingham, 1907
Hyposmocoma caecinervis Meyrick, 1928
Hyposmocoma catapyrrha (Meyrick, 1935)
Hyposmocoma centralis Walsingham, 1907
Hyposmocoma centronoma Meyrick, 1935
Hyposmocoma chilonella Walsingham, 1907
Hyposmocoma chloraula Meyrick, 1928
Hyposmocoma cleodorella (Walsingham, 1907)
Hyposmocoma columbella (Walsingham, 1907)
Hyposmocoma complanella (Walsingham, 1907)
Hyposmocoma confusa (Walsingham, 1907)
Hyposmocoma coprosmae (Swezey, 1920)
Hyposmocoma corticicolor (Walsingham, 1907)
Hyposmocoma cristata (Butler, 1881)
Hyposmocoma cryptogamiella (Walsingham, 1907)
Hyposmocoma cuprea (Walsingham, 1907)
Hyposmocoma diffusa (Walsingham, 1907)
Hyposmocoma digressa (Walsingham, 1907)
Hyposmocoma discolor Walsingham, 1907
Hyposmocoma divergens (Walsingham, 1907)
Hyposmocoma dorsella Walsingham, 1907
Hyposmocoma ekaha Swezey, 1910
Hyposmocoma elegans (Walsingham, 1907)
Hyposmocoma eleuthera (Walsingham, 1907)
Hyposmocoma emendata Walsingham, 1907
Hyposmocoma empetra (Meyrick, 1915)
Hyposmocoma enixa Walsingham, 1907
Hyposmocoma ensifer Walsingham, 1907
Hyposmocoma epicharis Walsingham, 1907
Hyposmocoma erebogramma (Meyrick, 1935)
Hyposmocoma erismatias Meyrick, 1928
Hyposmocoma exaltata (Walsingham, 1907)
Hyposmocoma exornata Walsingham, 1907
Hyposmocoma exsul (Walsingham, 1907)
Hyposmocoma falsimella Walsingham, 1907
Hyposmocoma ferruginea (Swezey, 1915)
Hyposmocoma flavicosta (Walsingham, 1907)
Hyposmocoma fluctuosa (Walsingham, 1907)
Hyposmocoma fractivittella Walsingham, 1907
Hyposmocoma fugitiva (Walsingham, 1907)
Hyposmocoma fulvida Walsingham, 1907
Hyposmocoma fulvocervina Walsingham, 1907
Hyposmocoma fulvogrisea (Walsingham, 1907)
Hyposmocoma fuscodentata (Walsingham, 1907)
Hyposmocoma fuscofusa (Walsingham, 1907)
Hyposmocoma fuscopurpurata Zimmerman,
Hyposmocoma hirsuta (Walsingham, 1907)
Hyposmocoma homopyrrha (Meyrick, 1935)
Hyposmocoma humerella (Walsingham, 1907)
Hyposmocoma incongrua (Walsingham, 1907)
Hyposmocoma inflexa Walsingham, 1907
Hyposmocoma insinuatrix Meyrick, 1928
Hyposmocoma jugifera Meyrick, 1928
Hyposmocoma kauaiensis (Walsingham, 1907)
Hyposmocoma latiflua Meyrick, 1915
Hyposmocoma lichenalis (Walsingham, 1907)
Hyposmocoma lignicolor (Walsingham, 1907)
Hyposmocoma limata Walsingham, 1907
Hyposmocoma longitudinalis Walsingham, 1907
Hyposmocoma lugens Walsingham, 1907
Hyposmocoma lunifer Walsingham, 1907
Hyposmocoma mactella (Walsingham, 1907)
Hyposmocoma maestella Walsingham, 1907
Hyposmocoma malacopa Meyrick, 1915
Hyposmocoma margella (Walsingham, 1907)
Hyposmocoma mediocris (Walsingham, 1907)
Hyposmocoma mormopica (Meyrick, 1935)
Hyposmocoma municeps (Walsingham, 1907)
Hyposmocoma mystodoxa Meyrick, 1915
Hyposmocoma nemo (Walsingham, 1907)
Hyposmocoma nemoricola (Walsingham, 1907)
Hyposmocoma nigrodentata Walsingham, 1907
Hyposmocoma ningorella (Walsingham, 1907)
Hyposmocoma ningorifera (Walsingham, 1907)
Hyposmocoma nipholoncha Meyrick, 1935
Hyposmocoma niveiceps Walsingham, 1907
Hyposmocoma obliterata Walsingham, 1907
Hyposmocoma obscura Walsingham, 1907
Hyposmocoma ocellata Walsingham, 1907
Hyposmocoma ochreovittella Walsingham, 1907
Hyposmocoma oculifera Walsingham, 1907
Hyposmocoma ossea Walsingham, 1907
Hyposmocoma pallidipalpis Walsingham, 1907
Hyposmocoma palmifera (Meyrick, 1935)
Hyposmocoma palmivora Meyrick, 1928
Hyposmocoma paltodorella (Walsingham, 1907)
Hyposmocoma passerella (Walsingham, 1907)
Hyposmocoma petalifera (Walsingham, 1907)
Hyposmocoma petroptilota (Walsingham, 1907)
Hyposmocoma phantasmatella Walsingham, 1907
Hyposmocoma philocharis (Meyrick, 1915)
Hyposmocoma pittospori (Swezey, 1920)
Hyposmocoma plumbifer (Walsingham, 1907)
Hyposmocoma pluviella (Walsingham, 1907)
Hyposmocoma poeciloceras (Walsingham, 1907)
Hyposmocoma polia (Walsingham, 1907)
Hyposmocoma praefracta (Meyrick, 1935)
Hyposmocoma pritchardiae (Swezey, 1933)
Hyposmocoma psaroderma (Walsingham, 1907)
Hyposmocoma pucciniella Walsingham, 1907
Hyposmocoma puncticiliata (Walsingham, 1907)
Hyposmocoma punctifumella Walsingham, 1907
Hyposmocoma quadripunctata Walsingham, 1907
Hyposmocoma quadristriata Walsingham, 1907
Hyposmocoma radiatella Walsingham, 1907
Hyposmocoma rediviva (Walsingham, 1907)
Hyposmocoma repandella (Walsingham, 1907)
Hyposmocoma roseofulva Walsingham, 1907
Hyposmocoma rotifer (Walsingham, 1907)
Hyposmocoma rusius Walsingham, 1907
Hyposmocoma rutilellum (Walsingham, 1907)
Hyposmocoma sagittata (Walsingham, 1907)
Hyposmocoma scandens Walsingham, 1907
Hyposmocoma scepticella (Walsingham, 1907)
Hyposmocoma sciurella (Walsingham, 1907)
Hyposmocoma semifuscata Walsingham, 1907
Hyposmocoma semiusta (Walsingham, 1907)
Hyposmocoma sideroxyloni (Swezey, 1932)
Hyposmocoma sordidella (Walsingham, 1907)
Hyposmocoma spurcata (Walsingham, 1907)
Hyposmocoma stigmatella Walsingham, 1907
Hyposmocoma subargentea Walsingham, 1907
Hyposmocoma subaurata (Walsingham, 1907)
Hyposmocoma subeburneum (Walsingham, 1907)
Hyposmocoma sublimata Walsingham, 1907
Hyposmocoma subnitida Walsingham, 1907
Hyposmocoma subocellata (Walsingham, 1907)
Hyposmocoma subsericea Walsingham, 1907
Hyposmocoma sudorella Walsingham, 1907
Hyposmocoma terminella (Walsingham, 1907)
Hyposmocoma thermoxyla Meyrick, 1915
Hyposmocoma tigrina (Butler, 1881)
Hyposmocoma tischeriella (Walsingham, 1907)
Hyposmocoma trichophora (Walsingham, 1907)
Hyposmocoma tricincta Walsingham, 1907
Hyposmocoma trilunella Walsingham, 1907
Hyposmocoma trivitella (Swezey, 1913)
Hyposmocoma unicolor (Walsingham, 1907)
Hyposmocoma veterella (Walsingham, 1907)
Hyposmocoma vicina Walsingham, 1907
Subgenus Hyposmocoma
Hyposmocoma abjecta (Butler, 1881)
Hyposmocoma adjacens (Walsingham, 1907)
Hyposmocoma admirationis Walsingham, 1907
Hyposmocoma advena Walsingham, 1907
Hyposmocoma albifrontella Walsingham, 1907
Hyposmocoma albonivea Walsingham, 1907
Hyposmocoma alliterata Walsingham, 1907
Hyposmocoma alveata (Meyrick, 1915)
Hyposmocoma anisoplecta Meyrick, 1935
Hyposmocoma arenella Walsingham, 1907
Hyposmocoma argentiferus (Walsingham, 1907)
Hyposmocoma atrovittella Walsingham, 1907
Hyposmocoma auripennis (Butler, 1881)
Hyposmocoma auropurpurea Walsingham, 1907
Hyposmocoma bacillella Walsingham, 1907
Hyposmocoma bella Walsingham, 1907
Hyposmocoma belophora Walsingham, 1907
Hyposmocoma bilineata Walsingham, 1907
Hyposmocoma blackburnii (Butler, 1881)
Hyposmocoma butalidella Walsingham, 1907
Hyposmocoma calva Walsingham, 1907
Hyposmocoma candidella (Walsingham, 1907)
Hyposmocoma canella Walsingham, 1907
Hyposmocoma carbonentata Walsingham, 1907
Hyposmocoma carnea Walsingham, 1907
Hyposmocoma cincta Walsingham, 1907
Hyposmocoma cinereosparsa Walsingham, 1907
Hyposmocoma commensella Walsingham, 1907
Hyposmocoma communis (Swezey, 1946)
Hyposmocoma conditella Walsingham, 1907
Hyposmocoma continuella Walsingham, 1907
Hyposmocoma coruscans (Walsingham, 1907)
Hyposmocoma corvina (Butler, 1881)
Hyposmocoma costimaculata Walsingham, 1907
Hyposmocoma crossotis Meyrick, 1915
Hyposmocoma cupreomaculata Walsingham, 1907
Hyposmocoma discella Walsingham, 1907
Hyposmocoma divisa Walsingham, 1907
Hyposmocoma domicolens (Butler, 1881)
Hyposmocoma elegantula (Swezey, 1934)
Hyposmocoma empedota Meyrick, 1915
Hyposmocoma endryas Meyrick, 1915
Hyposmocoma evanescens Walsingham, 1907
Hyposmocoma fallacella Walsingham, 1907
Hyposmocoma ferricolor Walsingham, 1907
Hyposmocoma fervida Walsingham, 1907
Hyposmocoma filicivora Meyrick, 1935
Hyposmocoma flavipalpis (Walsingham, 1907)
Hyposmocoma fractinubella Wahingham, 1907
Hyposmocoma fractistriata Walsingham, 1907
Hyposmocoma fuscopurpurea Walsingham, 1907
Hyposmocoma fuscotogata Walsingham, 1907
Hyposmocoma geminella Walsingham, 1907
Hyposmocoma genitalis Walsingham, 1907
Hyposmocoma haleakalae (Butler, 1881)
Hyposmocoma hemicasis Meyrick, 1935
Hyposmocoma humerovittella Walsingham, 1907
Hyposmocoma hygroscopa Meyrick, 1935
Hyposmocoma illuminata Walsingham, 1907
Hyposmocoma impunctata Walsingham, 1907
Hyposmocoma indicella Walsingham, 1907
Hyposmocoma intermixta Walsingham, 1907
Hyposmocoma inversella Walsingham, 1907
Hyposmocoma iodes Walsingham, 1907
Hyposmocoma irregularis Walsingham, 1907
Hyposmocoma lacertella Walsingham, 1907
Hyposmocoma lactea Walsingham, 1907
Hyposmocoma lacticretella Walsingham, 1907
Hyposmocoma lebetella Walsingham, 1907
Hyposmocoma leporella Walsingham, 1907
Hyposmocoma lignivora (Butler, 1879)
Hyposmocoma lineata Walsingham, 1907
Hyposmocoma liturata Walsingham, 1907
Hyposmocoma lixiviella Walsingham, 1907
Hyposmocoma longisquamella (Walsingham, 1907)
Hyposmocoma lucifer Walsingham, 1907
Hyposmocoma ludificata Walsingham, 1907
Hyposmocoma lupella Walsingham, 1907
Hyposmocoma malornata Walsingham, 1907
Hyposmocoma marginenotata Walsingham, 1907
Hyposmocoma mediella Walsingham, 1907
Hyposmocoma mediospurcata Walsingham, 1907
Hyposmocoma mesorectis Meyrick, 1915
Hyposmocoma metallica Walsingham, 1907
Hyposmocoma metrosiderella Walsingham, 1907
Hyposmocoma mimema Walsingham, 1907
Hyposmocoma mimica Walsingham, 1907
Hyposmocoma modesta Walsingham, 1907
Hyposmocoma montivolans (Butler, 1882)
Hyposmocoma nebulifera Walsingham, 1907
Hyposmocoma neckerensis (Swezey, 1926)
Hyposmocoma nephelodes Walsingham, 1908
Hyposmocoma niger Walsingham, 1907
Hyposmocoma nigralbida Walsingham, 1907
Hyposmocoma nigrescens Walsingham, 1907
Hyposmocoma nividorsella Walsingham, 1907
Hyposmocoma notabilis Walsingham, 1907
Hyposmocoma numida Walsingham, 1907
Hyposmocoma ochreocervina Walsingham, 1907
Hyposmocoma ochreociliata Walsingham, 1907
Hyposmocoma oxypetra Meyrick, 1935
Hyposmocoma paradoxa Walsingham, 1907
Hyposmocoma parda (Butler, 1881)
Hyposmocoma partita Walsingham, 1907
Hyposmocoma patriciella Walsingham, 1907
Hyposmocoma persimilis Walsingham, 1907
Hyposmocoma petroscia Meyrick, 1915
Hyposmocoma phalacra Walsingham, 1907
Hyposmocoma pharsotoma Meyrick, 1915
Hyposmocoma picticornis Walsingham, 1907
Hyposmocoma progressa Walsingham, 1907
Hyposmocoma prophantis Meyrick, 1915
Hyposmocoma propinqua Walsingham, 1907
Hyposmocoma pseudolita Walsingham, 1907
Hyposmocoma punctiplicata Walsingham, 1907
Hyposmocoma quinquemaculata Walsingham, 1907
Hyposmocoma rhabdophora Walsingham, 1907
Hyposmocoma rubescens Walsingham, 1907
Hyposmocoma sabulella Walsingham, 1907
Hyposmocoma saccophora Walsingham, 1907
Hyposmocoma saliaris Walsingham, 1907
Hyposmocoma scapulellum (Walsingham, 1907)
Hyposmocoma schismatica Walsingham, 1907
Hyposmocoma scolopax Walsingham, 1907
Hyposmocoma semicolon (Walsingham, 1907)
Hyposmocoma semifusa (Walsingham, 1907)
Hyposmocoma sideritis Walsingham, 1907
Hyposmocoma similis Walsingham, 1907
Hyposmocoma somatodes Walsingham, 1907
Hyposmocoma straminella Walsingham, 1907
Hyposmocoma subcitrella Walsingham, 1907
Hyposmocoma subflavidella Wralsingham, 1907
Hyposmocoma subscolopax Walsingham, 1907
Hyposmocoma suffusa (Walsingham, 1907)
Hyposmocoma suffusella (Walsingham, 1907)
Hyposmocoma swezeyi (Busck, 1914)
Hyposmocoma syrrhaptes Walsingham, 1907
Hyposmocoma tarsimaculata Walsingham, 1907
Hyposmocoma tenuipalpis Walsingham, 1907
Hyposmocoma tetraonella Walsingham, 1907
Hyposmocoma thiatma Meyrick, 1935
Hyposmocoma thoracella Walsingham, 1907
Hyposmocoma tomentosa Walsingham, 1907
Hyposmocoma torella Walsingham, 1907
Hyposmocoma torquata Walsingham, 1907
Hyposmocoma trifasciata (Swezey, 1915)
Hyposmocoma trimaculata Walsingham, 1907
Hyposmocoma trimelanota Meyrick, 1935
Hyposmocoma tripartita Walsingham, 1907
Hyposmocoma triptila Meyrick, 1915
Hyposmocoma trossulella Walsingham, 1907
Hyposmocoma turdella Walsingham, 1907
Hyposmocoma unistriata Walsingham, 1907
Hyposmocoma vermiculata Walsingham, 1907
Hyposmocoma vinicolor Walsingham, 1907
Hyposmocoma virgata Walsingham, 1907
Unknown subgenus
Hyposmocoma anoai Medeiros, Haines & Rubinoff, 2017
Hyposmocoma aumakuawai P. Schmitz & Rubinoff, 2011
Hyposmocoma carnivora P. Schmitz & Rubinoff, 2011
Hyposmocoma eepawai P. Schmitz & Rubinoff, 2011
Hyposmocoma ekemamao Schmitz and Rubinoff, 2009
Hyposmocoma eliai P. Schmitz & Rubinoff, 2011
Hyposmocoma hooilo Medeiros, Haines & Rubinoff, 2017
Hyposmocoma ipohapuu Kawahara & Rubinoff, 2012
Hyposmocoma ipowainui P. Schmitz & Rubinoff, 2011
Hyposmocoma kahaiao P. Schmitz & Rubinoff, 2011
Hyposmocoma kahamanoa P. Schmitz & Rubinoff, 2011
Hyposmocoma kaikuono Schmitz & Rubinoff, 2008
Hyposmocoma kamakou P. Schmitz & Rubinoff, 2011
Hyposmocoma kamaula Medeiros, Haines & Rubinoff, 2017
Hyposmocoma kanaloa Medeiros, Haines & Rubinoff, 2017
Hyposmocoma kapakai Schmitz & Rubinoff, 2008
Hyposmocoma kaupo Schmitz & Rubinoff, 2008
Hyposmocoma kawaikoi P. Schmitz & Rubinoff, 2011
Hyposmocoma kikokolu Schmitz and Rubinoff, 2009
Hyposmocoma laysanensis Schmitz and Rubinoff, 2009
Hyposmocoma mahoepo Medeiros, Haines & Rubinoff, 2017
Hyposmocoma makawao Kawahara & Rubinoff, 2012
Hyposmocoma menehune Schmitz and Rubinoff, 2009
Hyposmocoma mokumana Schmitz and Rubinoff, 2009
Hyposmocoma molluscivora Haines & Rubinoff, 2006
Hyposmocoma moopalikea P. Schmitz & Rubinoff, 2011
Hyposmocoma nihoa Schmitz and Rubinoff, 2009
Hyposmocoma nohomaalewa P. Schmitz & Rubinoff, 2011
Hyposmocoma nohomeha Medeiros, Haines & Rubinoff, 2017
Hyposmocoma oolea Medeiros, Haines & Rubinoff, 2017
Hyposmocoma opuulaau P. Schmitz & Rubinoff, 2011
Hyposmocoma opuumaloo Schmitz and Rubinoff, 2009
Hyposmocoma pahanalo Medeiros, Haines & Rubinoff, 2017
Hyposmocoma papahanau Schmitz and Rubinoff, 2009
Hyposmocoma papaiili P. Schmitz & Rubinoff, 2011
Hyposmocoma pukoa P. Schmitz & Rubinoff, 2011
Hyposmocoma pupumoehewa P. Schmitz & Rubinoff, 2011
Hyposmocoma tantala Kawahara & Rubinoff, 2012
Hyposmocoma uhauiole P. Schmitz & Rubinoff, 2011
Hyposmocoma waauhi Medeiros, Haines & Rubinoff, 2017
Hyposmocoma wahikanake P. Schmitz & Rubinoff, 2011
Hyposmocoma waihohonu P. Schmitz & Rubinoff, 2011
Hyposmocoma waikamoi P. Schmitz & Rubinoff, 2011
Hyposmocoma wailua P. Schmitz & Rubinoff, 2011

There are a number of undescribed species.

See also
Amphibious caterpillar

References

External links
"James Bond, Caterpillar" Article and video featuring Hyposmocoma. Maui No Ka 'Oi Magazine Volume 14 Number. 3 (July 2010).

 
Cosmopteriginae
Endemic moths of Hawaii
Moth genera